The 1912 U.S. Open was the 18th U.S. Open, held August 1–2 at the Country Club of Buffalo in Amherst, New York, a suburb east of Buffalo. (The course is now Grover Cleveland Golf Course, owned by Erie County. The Country Club of Buffalo relocated several miles east in 1926 to Williamsville.) Twenty-year-old John McDermott successfully defended his U.S. Open title, two strokes ahead of runner-up Tom McNamara.

At the end of the second round on Thursday, Mike Brady, Percy Barrett, and Alex Smith were tied for the lead, with defending champion McDermott two back.

In the third round on Friday morning, played in rainy conditions with thunderstorms threatening to disrupt play, McDermott managed to card a 74 despite hitting two drives out of bounds. He still trailed Brady by three going into the final round in the afternoon, but Brady struggled on his way to a 79 and 299 total. McNamara, seven back at the start of the round, fired a course-record 69 to post 296; his 142 over the last two rounds was a new tournament record, but not enough to catch McDermott. Despite a bogey on the last hole, McDermott carded a 71 for a 294 total, two shots ahead of McNamara.

McDermott, age 20, was already a two-time U.S. Open champion, but by 1914 his golf career was over. After a series of personal setbacks, he began suffering from mental illness and spent most of the rest of his life in a mental institution.

Jim Barnes, a future champion in 1921, tied for 18th in his first U.S. Open. Horace Rawlins, the winner of the inaugural Open in 1895, made his final appearance and missed the cut.

The par-6 tenth hole measured , the longest hole in U.S. Open history up to that point and the only time a hole was given a par more than five.

Course

(present-day Grover Cleveland Golf Course)

Past champions in the field 

Source:

Did not play: Laurie Auchterlonie (1902), Harry Vardon (1900), Willie Smith (1899).

Round summaries

First round
Thursday, August 1, 1912 (morning)

Source:

Second round
Thursday, August 1, 1912 (afternoon)

Source:

Third round
Friday, August 2, 1912 (morning)

Source:

Final round
Friday, August 2, 1912 (afternoon)

Source:

Amateurs: Travis (+11), J. Anderson (+14), Gardner (+23), Lee (+29).

References

External links
USGA.org

U.S. Open (golf)
Golf in New York (state)
U.S. Open (golf)
U.S. Open (golf)
U.S. Open
August 1912 sports events